The Poor Nut is a 1927 American comedy film directed by Richard Wallace and written by Paul Schofield. It is based on the 1925 play The Poor Nut by J. C. Nugent and Elliott Nugent. The film stars Jack Mulhall, Charles Murray, Jean Arthur, Jane Winton, Glenn Tryon and Cornelius Keefe. The film was released on August 7, 1927, by First National Pictures.

Cast      
Jack Mulhall as John 'Jack' Miller
Charles Murray as Doc Murphy
Jean Arthur as Margie Blake
Jane Winton as Julia Winters
Glenn Tryon as Magpie Welch
Cornelius Keefe as Wallie Pierce
Maurice Ryan as Hub Smith
Henry Vibart as Professor Demming
Bruce Gordon as Coach Jackson
William Courtright as Colonel Small
Paul Kelly as Spike Hoyt

References

External links
 

1927 films
1920s English-language films
Silent American comedy films
1927 comedy films
First National Pictures films
Films directed by Richard Wallace
American silent feature films
American black-and-white films
1920s American films